The Amana Corporation is an American brand of household appliances. It was founded in 1934 by George Foerstner as The Electrical Equipment Co. in Middle Amana, Iowa, to manufacture commercial walk-in coolers. The business was later owned by the Amana Society and became known as Amana Refrigeration, Inc. It is now owned by the Whirlpool Corporation.

History
In 1947, Amana manufactured the first upright freezer for the home, and in 1949 it added a side-by-side refrigerator. In 1950 the company was sold to a group of investors, including its founder, and became Amana Refrigeration, Inc.

In 1954, it began making air conditioners. Amana was acquired in 1965 by Raytheon, which had invented the microwave oven in 1947, and introduced the commercial Radarange Model 1611 in 1954. In 1967, Amana introduced a consumer model of the Radarange, the first popular microwave designed for home use.

In 1997, the company was purchased by Goodman Global (now part of Daikin North America), a heating-and-cooling manufacturer who sold it to Maytag (now part of Whirlpool) in 2002. Goodman still owns Amana's air conditioner and furnace division, and Amana home appliances are now owned and manufactured by the Whirlpool Corporation. Amana Under Counter Wine was spun off and is now marketed under the Aficionado marquee.

Amana has since expanded into manufacturing a variety of other appliances, including furnaces, ovens, countertop ranges, dishwashers, and clothes washers and dryers. Whirlpool manufactures products under the Amana, JennAir, KitchenAid, Maytag and Whirlpool name at their factory in Amana, Iowa. The plant, in operation since 1940, was sold in October, 2020 to Wramia001, a Chicago-based limited liability company. The company has a long-term lease agreement.

References

External links 
 

Amana Colonies
Heating, ventilation, and air conditioning companies
Manufacturing companies based in Iowa
Whirlpool Corporation brands
Maytag brands
Raytheon Company
Electronics companies established in 1934
1934 establishments in Iowa
Benton Harbor, Michigan
1997 mergers and acquisitions
American brands
Daikin